The Annual Report on the Protection of the Constitution is an annual report on the activities of far right, far left, and Islamic extremist circles and on espionage activities in Germany.

While the state-level counterparts, the State Offices for the Protection of the Constitution contribute to the federal annual report, most federal states publish their individual annual reports for their regional area of responsibility.

References

External links 
 Verfassungsschutzbericht, Bundesamt für Verfassungsschutz

 
Government reports
1968 establishments in Germany